Neoamphorophora is a genus of true bugs belonging to the family Aphididae.

The species of this genus are found in Europe and Northern America.

Species:
 Neoamphorophora kalmiae Mason, 1924 
 Neoamphorophora ledi (Wahlgren, 1938)

References

Aphididae